The 1884 South Australian Football Association season was the 8th season of the top-level Australian rules football competition in South Australia.

 went on to record its 1st premiership and in doing so ended 's run of 6 straight premierships.

The season would be the last of the South Park Football Club and the North Adelaide Football Club, previously known as the Victorian Football Club. It shares no relation to the modern day  Roosters.

Premiership season

Round 1

Round 2

Round 3

Round 4

Round 5

Round 6

Round 7

Round 8

Round 9

Round 10

Round 11

Round 12

Round 13

Round 14

Round 15

Round 16

Round 17

Win/Loss table 

X – Bye
Opponent for round listed above margin

Ladder 

Note: Norwood were ranked ahead of South Adelaide on head-to-head record (2-1), and South Park were ranked ahead of North Adelaide on head-to-head record (1-0-1).

References 

SANFL
South Australian National Football League seasons